The Barbary pirates, Barbary corsairs, or Ottoman corsairs were Muslim pirates and privateers who operated from North Africa, based primarily in the ports of Salé, Rabat, Algiers, Tunis, and Tripoli. This area was known in Europe as the Barbary Coast, in reference to the Berbers. Their predation extended throughout the Mediterranean, south along West Africa's Atlantic seaboard and into the North Atlantic as far north as Iceland, but they primarily operated in the western Mediterranean. In addition to seizing merchant ships, they engaged in Razzias, raids on European coastal towns and villages, mainly in Italy, France, Spain, and Portugal, but also in the British Isles, the Netherlands, and Iceland. The main purpose of their attacks was to capture slaves for the Ottoman slave trade. Slaves in Barbary could be of many ethnicities, and of many different religions, such as Christian, Jewish, or Muslim.

While such raids had occurred since soon after the Muslim conquest of the Iberian Peninsula in the 710s, the terms "Barbary pirates" and "Barbary corsairs" are normally applied to the raiders active from the 16th century onwards, when the frequency and range of the slavers' attacks increased. In that period, Algiers, Tunis and Tripoli came under the sovereignty of the Ottoman Empire, either as directly administered provinces or as autonomous dependencies known as the Barbary states. Similar raids were undertaken from Salé (see Salé Rovers) and other ports in Morocco.

Barbary corsairs captured thousands of merchant ships and repeatedly raided coastal towns. As a result, residents abandoned their former villages of long stretches of coast in Spain and Italy. Between 100,000 and 250,000 Iberians were enslaved by these raids.

The raids were such a problem that coastal settlements were seldom undertaken until the 19th century. Between 1580 and 1680 corsairs were said to have captured about 850,000 people as slaves and from 1530 to 1780 as many as 1.25 million people were enslaved. However, these numbers have been questioned by the historian David Earle. Some of these corsairs were European outcasts and converts (renegade) such as John Ward and Zymen Danseker. Hayreddin Barbarossa and Oruç Reis, Turkish Barbarossa brothers, who took control of Algiers on behalf of the Ottomans in the early 16th century, were also notorious corsairs. The European pirates brought advanced sailing and shipbuilding techniques to the Barbary Coast around 1600, which enabled the corsairs to extend their activities into the Atlantic Ocean. The effects of the Barbary raids peaked in the early-to-mid-17th century.

Long after Europeans had abandoned oar-driven vessels in favor of sailing ships carrying tons of powerful cannon, many Barbary warships were galleys carrying a hundred or more fighting men armed with cutlasses and small arms. The Barbary navies were not battle fleets. When they sighted a European frigate, they fled.

The scope of corsair activity began to diminish in the latter part of the 17th century, as the more powerful European navies started to compel the Barbary States to make peace and cease attacking their shipping. However, the ships and coasts of Christian states without such effective protection continued to suffer until the early 19th century. Between 1801 and 1815, occasional incidents occurred, including two Barbary wars waged by the United States, Sweden and the Kingdom of Sicily against the Barbary States. Following the Napoleonic Wars and the Congress of Vienna in 1814–15, European powers agreed upon the need to suppress the Barbary corsairs entirely. The threat was finally subdued by the French conquest of Algeria in 1830 and subsequent pacification by the French during the mid-to-late 19th century.

History
Barbary pirates were active from medieval times to the 1800s.

The Middle Ages
In 1198 the problem of Barbary piracy and slave-taking was so great that the Trinitarians, a religious order, were founded to collect ransoms and even to exchange themselves as ransom for those captured and pressed into slavery in North Africa. In the 14th century Tunisian corsairs became enough of a threat to provoke a Franco-Genoese attack on Mahdia in 1390, also known as the "Barbary Crusade". Morisco exiles of the Reconquista and Maghreb pirates added to the numbers, but it was not until the expansion of the Ottoman Empire and the arrival of the privateer and admiral Kemal Reis in 1487 that the Barbary corsairs became a true menace to shipping from European Christian nations.

16th century

From 1559, the North African cities of Algiers, Tunis, and Tripoli, although nominally part of the Ottoman Empire, were in fact military republics that chose their own rulers and lived by war booty captured from the Spanish and Portuguese. There are several cases of Sephardic Jews, including Sinan Reis and Samuel Pallache, who upon fleeing Iberia turned to attacking the Spanish Empire's shipping under the Ottoman flag, a profitable strategy of revenge for the Inquisition's religious persecution.

During the first period (1518–1587), the beylerbeys were admirals of the sultan, commanding great fleets and conducting war operations for political ends. They were slave-hunters and their methods were ferocious. After 1587, the sole object of their successors became plunder, on land and sea. The maritime operations were conducted by the captains, or reises, who formed a class or even a corporation. Cruisers were fitted out by investors and commanded by the reises. Ten percent of the value of the prizes was paid to the pasha or his successors, who bore the titles of agha or dey or bey.

In 1544 Hayreddin captured the island of Ischia, taking 4,000 prisoners, and enslaved some 2,000–7,000 inhabitants of Lipari. In 1551 Turgut Reis enslaved the entire population of the Maltese island of Gozo, between 5,000 and 6,000, sending them to Ottoman Tripolitania. In 1554 corsairs under Turgut Reis sacked Vieste, beheaded 5,000 of its inhabitants, and abducted another 6,000.

17th century

A notable counter action occurred in 1607, when the Knights of Saint Stephen (under Jacopo Inghirami) sacked Bona in Algeria, killing 470 and taking 1,464 captives. This victory is commemorated by a series of frescoes painted by Bernardino Poccetti in the "Sala di Bona" of Palazzo Pitti, Florence. In 1611 Spanish galleys from Naples, accompanied by the galleys of the Knights of Malta, raided the Kerkennah Islands off the coast of Tunisia and took away almost 500 Muslim captives. Between 1568 and 1634 the Knights of Saint Stephen may have captured about 14,000 Muslims, with perhaps one-third taken in land raids and two-thirds taken on captured ships.

Ireland was subject to a similar attack. In June 1631 Murat Reis, with corsairs from Algiers and armed troops of the Ottoman Empire, stormed ashore at the little harbor village of Baltimore, County Cork. They captured almost all the villagers and took them away to a life of slavery in North Africa. The prisoners were destined for a variety of fates—some lived out their days chained to the oars as galley slaves, while women spent long years as concubines in harems or within the walls of the sultan's palace. Only two of these captives ever returned to Ireland. England was also subject to pirate raids; in 1640 sixty men, women and children were enslaved by Algerian pirates who raided Penzance.

More than 20,000 captives were said to be imprisoned in Algiers alone. The rich were often able to secure release through ransom, but the poor were condemned to slavery. Their masters would on occasion allow them to secure freedom by professing Islam. A long list might be given of people of good social position, not only Italians or Spaniards, but German or English travelers in the south, who were captives for a time.

In 1675 a Royal Navy squadron led by Sir John Narborough negotiated a lasting peace with Tunis and, after bombarding the city to induce compliance, with Tripoli.

18th–19th centuries

Piracy was enough of a problem that some states entered into the redemption business. In Denmark, "At the beginning of the 18th century money was collected systematically in all churches, and a so called 'slave fund' (slavekasse) was established by the state in 1715. Funds were brought in through a compulsory insurance sum for seafarers. 165 slaves were ransomed by this institution between 1716 and 1736." "Between 1716 and 1754 nineteen ships from Denmark-Norway were captured with 208 men; piracy was thus a serious problem for the Danish merchant fleet."

During the American Revolutionary War, the pirates attacked American merchant vessels in the Mediterranean. However, on December 20, 1777, Sultan Mohammed III of Morocco issued a declaration recognizing America as an independent country, and stating that American merchant ships could enjoy safe passage into the Mediterranean and along the coast. The relations were formalized with the Moroccan–American Treaty of Friendship signed in 1786, which stands as the U.S.'s oldest non-broken friendship treaty with a foreign power.

Until the American Declaration of Independence in 1776, British treaties with the North African states protected American ships from the Barbary corsairs. Morocco, which in 1777 was the first independent nation to publicly recognize the United States, in 1784 became the first Barbary power to seize an American vessel after the nation achieved independence. The Barbary threat led directly to the United States founding the United States Navy in March 1794. While the United States did secure peace treaties with the Barbary states, it was obliged to pay tribute for protection from attack. The burden was substantial: from 1795, the annual tribute paid to the Regency of Algiers amounted to 20% of United States federal government's annual expenditures.

In 1798, an islet near Sardinia was attacked by the Tunisians, and more than 900 inhabitants were taken away as slaves.

The Barbary states had difficulty securing uniform compliance with a total prohibition of slave-raiding, as this had been traditionally of central importance to the North African economy. Slavers continued to take captives by preying on less well-protected peoples. Algiers subsequently renewed its slave-raiding, though on a smaller scale. Europeans at the Congress of Aix-la-Chapelle in 1818 discussed possible retaliation. In 1824 a British fleet under Admiral Sir Harry Burrard Neale bombarded Algiers. Corsair activity based in Algiers did not entirely cease until France conquered the state in 1830.

Barbary slave trade

From bases on the Barbary coast, North Africa, the Barbary pirates raided ships traveling through the Mediterranean and along the northern and western coasts of Africa, plundering their cargo and enslaving the people they captured. From at least 1500, the pirates also conducted raids along seaside towns of Italy, France, Spain, Portugal, England, the Netherlands and as far away as Iceland, capturing men, women and children. On some occasions, settlements such as Baltimore, Ireland were abandoned following the raid, only being resettled many years later. Between 1609 and 1616, England alone had 466 merchant ships lost to Barbary pirates.

Slave quarters
At night the slaves were put into prisons called 'bagnios' (derived from the Italian word "bagno" for public bath, inspired by the Turks' use of Roman baths at Constantinople as prisons), which were often hot and overcrowded. Bagnios had chapels, hospitals, shops and bars run by captives.

Galley slaves

Although the conditions in bagnios were harsh, they were better than those endured by galley slaves. Most Barbary galleys were at sea for around eighty to a hundred days a year, but when the slaves assigned to them were on land, they were forced to do hard manual labor. There were exceptions: "galley slaves of the Ottoman Sultan in Constantinople would be permanently confined to their galleys, and often served extremely long terms, averaging around nineteen years in the late seventeenth-century and early eighteenth-century periods. These slaves rarely got off the galley but lived there for years." During this time, rowers were shackled and chained where they sat, and never allowed to leave. Sleeping (which was limited), eating, defecation and urination took place at the seat to which they were shackled. There were usually five or six rowers on each oar. Overseers would walk back and forth and whip slaves considered not to be working hard enough.

Number of people enslaved
According to Robert Davis, between 1 million and 1.25 million Europeans were captured by Barbary pirates and sold as slaves in North Africa and Ottoman Empire between the 16th and 19th centuries. However, to extrapolate his numbers, Davis assumes the number of European slaves captured by Barbary pirates were constant for a 250-year period, stating:

Historians welcomed Davis's attempt to quantify the number of European slaves, but were divided as to the accuracy of the unorthodox methodology which he relied on in the absence of written records. The historian David Earle, author of The Corsairs of Malta and Barbary and The Pirate Wars, questioned Davis, saying "His figures sound a bit dodgy and I think he may be exaggerating." He cautioned that the true picture of European slaves is clouded by the fact that the corsairs also seized non-Christian whites from eastern Europe and black people from west Africa. He wouldn't "hazard a guess about their total". Professor Ian Blanchard, an expert on African trade and economic history at the University of Edinburgh, said that Davis's work was solid and that a number over a million was in line with his expectations.

Davis notes that his calculations were based on observers reports of approximately 35,000 European Christian slaves on the Barbary Coast at any one time during the late 1500s and early 1600s, held in Tripoli, Tunis and, mostly, Algiers.

Legacy
The history of Muslim enslavement of white Europeans has been cited by some as contextualising the importance of subsequent European and American enslavement of blacks. Scholar Robert Davis noted that the larger picture isn't so one-sided: during a "clash of empires... taking slaves was part of the conflict," and at the same time 2 million Europeans were enslaved by Muslims in North Africa and the Near East, 1 million Muslim slaves in Europe.

As Dr. John Callow at University of Suffolk notes, the experience of enslavement by the Barbary pirates preceded the Atlantic slave trade and "the memory of slavery, and the methodology of slaving, that was burned into the British consciousness was first and foremost rooted in a North African context, where Britons were more likely to be slaves than slave masters."

Barbary corsairs
According to historian Adrian Tinniswood, the most notorious corsairs were European renegades who had learned their trade as privateers, and who moved to the Barbary Coast during peacetime to pursue their trade. These outcasts, who had converted to Islam, brought up-to-date naval expertise to the piracy business, and enabled the corsairs to make long-distance slave-catching raids as far away as Iceland and Newfoundland. Infamous corsair Henry Mainwaring, who was initially a lawyer and pirate-hunter, later returned home to a royal pardon. Mainwaring later wrote a book about the practise of piracy in the Mediterranean, aptly titled the Discourse of Pirates. In the book, Mainwaring outlined potential methods to hunt down and eliminate piracy.

Barbarossa brothers

Oruç Barbarossa

The most famous of the corsairs in North Africa were the Barbarossa brothers, Aruj and Khayr al-Din. They, and two less well-known brothers all became Barbary corsairs in the service of the Ottoman Empire; they were called the Barbarossas (Italian for Redbeards) after the red beard of Oruç, the eldest. Oruç captured the island of Djerba for the Ottoman Empire in 1502 or 1503. He often attacked Spanish territories on the coast of North Africa; during one failed attempt in 1512 he lost his left arm to a cannonball. The eldest Barbarossa also went on a rampage through Algiers in 1516, and captured the town with the help of the Ottoman Empire. He executed the ruler of Algiers and everybody he suspected would oppose him, including local rulers. He was finally captured and killed by the Spanish in 1518, and put on display.

Hızır Hayreddin Barbarossa

Oruç, based mainly on land, was not the best-known of the Barbarossas. His youngest brother Hızır (later called Hayreddin or Kheir ed-Din) was a more traditional corsair. He was a capable engineer and spoke at least six languages. He dyed the hair of his head and beard with henna to redden it like Oruç's. After capturing many crucial coastal areas, Hayreddin was appointed admiral-in-chief of the Ottoman sultan's fleet. Under his command the Ottoman Empire was able to gain and keep control of the Mediterranean for over thirty years. Barbaros Hızır Hayreddin Pasha died in 1546 of a fever, possibly the plague.

Captain Jack Ward

English corsair Jack, or John, Ward was once called "beyond doubt the greatest scoundrel that ever sailed from England" by the English ambassador to Venice. Ward was a privateer for Queen Elizabeth during her war with Spain; after the end of the war, he became a corsair. With some associates he captured a ship in about 1603 and sailed it to Tunis; he and his crew converted to Islam. He was successful and became rich. He introduced heavily armed square-rigged ships, used instead of galleys, to the North African area, a major reason for the Barbary's future dominance of the Mediterranean. He died of plague in 1622.

Sayyida al-Hurra

Sayyida al-Hurra was a female Muslim cleric, merchant, governor of Tétouan, and later the wife of the sultan of Morocco. She was born around 1485 in the Emirate of Granada, but was forced to flee to Morocco when she was very young to escape the Reconquista. In Morocco, she gathered a crew largely of exiled Moors, and launched pirate expeditions against Spain and Portugal to avenge the Reconquista, protect Morocco from Christian pirates, and seek riches and glory. She co-founded the Barbary Corsairs with her allies the Barbarossa brothers. Sayyida al-Hurra became wealthy and renowned enough for the Sultan of Morocco, Ahmad al-Wattasi to make her his queen. Notably, however, she refused to marry in his capital of Fez, and would not get married but in Tétouan, of which she was governor. This was the first and only time in history that a Moroccan monarch had married away from his capital.

Other Barbary corsairs

 Kemal Reis (–1511)
 Gedik Ahmed Pasha (died 1482)
 Sinan Reis (died 1546)
 Piri Reis (died 1554 or 1555)
 Turgut Reis (1485–1565)
 Sinan Pasha (died 1553)
 Kurtoğlu Muslihiddin Reis (1487–)
 Kurtoğlu Hızır Reis
 Salih Reis (–1568)
 Seydi Ali Reis (1498–1563)
 Piyale Pasha (–1578)
 Raïs Hamidou (1773–1815)
 Uluç Ali Reis (1519–1587)
 Ali Bitchin (–1645)
 Simon de Danser or Simon Reis (–)
 Ivan-Dirkie de Veenboer or Sulayman Reis (died 1620)
 Murat Reis the Elder (–1638)
 Jan Janszoon or Murat Reis the Younger (–after 1641)

In fiction

Barbary corsairs are protagonists in Le pantere di Algeri (the panthers of Algiers) by Emilio Salgari. They were featured in a number of other noted novels, including Robinson Crusoe by Daniel Defoe, The Count of Monte Cristo by Alexandre Dumas, père, The Wind in the Willows by Kenneth Grahame, The Sea Hawk and the Sword of Islam by Rafael Sabatini, The Algerine Captive by Royall Tyler, Master and Commander by Patrick O'Brian, the Baroque Cycle by Neal Stephenson, The Walking Drum by Louis Lamour, Doctor Dolittle by Hugh Lofting, Corsair by Clive Cussler and Angélique in Barbary by Anne Golon. Miguel de Cervantes, the Spanish author, was captive for five years as a slave in the bagnio of Algiers, and reflected his experience in some of his fictional (but not directly autobiographical) writings, including the Captive's tale in Don Quixote, his two plays set in Algiers, El Trato de Argel (The Treaty of Algiers) and Los Baños de Argel (The Baths of Algiers), and episodes in a number of other works. In Mozart's opera Die Entführung aus dem Serail (a Singspiel), two European ladies are discovered in a Turkish harem, presumably captured by Barbary corsairs. Rossini's opera L'italiana in Algeri is based on the capture of several slaves by Barbary corsairs led by the bey of Algiers.

See also

 Albanian piracy
 Anglo-Turkish piracy
 Barbary slave trade
 Barbary treaties
 Circassian beauty
 Ghazi (warrior)
 History of slavery in the Muslim world
 Islamic views on slavery
 List of Ottoman conquests, sieges and landings
 Mathurin Romegas
 Morisco
 Morocco–United States relations
 Ottoman–Habsburg wars
 Ottoman Imperial Harem
 Ottoman Navy
 Piracy in Scotland
 Republic of Salé
 Slavery in the Ottoman Empire
 Turkish Abductions

Notes

References

 Clissold, Stephen. 1976. "Christian Renegades and Barbary Corsairs." History Today 26, no. 8: 508–515. Historical Abstracts.
 Davis, Robert C., Christian Slaves, Muslim Masters: White Slavery in the Mediterranean, The Barbary Coast, and Italy, 1500–1800. Palgrave Macmillan, New York. 2003. 
 Earle, Peter. The Pirate Wars. Thomas Dunne. 2003
 Forester, C. S. The Barbary Pirates. Random House. 1953
 Konstam, Angus A History of Pirates.
 Kristensen, Jens Riise, Barbary To and Fro Ørby Publishing. 2005.
 Leiner, Frederick C. The End of Barbary Terror: America's 1815 War against the Pirates of North Africa. Oxford University Press, Oxford. 2006
 Lambert, Frank. The Barbary Wars: American Independence in the Atlantic World. Hill & Wang, 2005JJos
 Lloyd, Christopher. 1979. "Captain John Ward: Pirate." History Today 29, no. 11; p. 751.
 Matar, Nabil. 2001. "The Barbary Corsairs, King Charles I and the Civil War." Seventeenth Century 16, no. 2; pp. 239–258.
 Pryor, John H., Geography, Technology, and WarStudies in the Maritime History of the Mediterranean, 649–1571. Cambridge University Press, Cambridge. 1988. 
 Severn, Derek. "The Bombardment of Algiers, 1816." History Today 28, no. 1 (1978); pp. 31–39.
 Silverstein, Paul A. 2005. "The New Barbarians: Piracy and Terrorism on the North African Frontier." CR: The New Centennial Review 5, no. 1; pp. 179–212.
 Travers, Tim, Pirates: A History. Tempus Publishing, Gloucestershire. 2007.
 World Navies
 To the Shores of Tripoli: The Birth of the U.S. Navy and Marines.—Annapolis, MD : Naval Institute Press, 1991, 2001.

Further reading

 Clark, G. N. "The Barbary Corsairs in the Seventeenth Century." Cambridge Historical Journal 8#1 (1944): 22–35. online.
Gawalt, Gerard W. "America and the Barbary pirates: An international battle against an unconventional foe." (Library of Congress, 2011)  online.
 London, Joshua E. Victory in Tripoli: How America's War with the Barbary Pirates Established the U.S. Navy and Shaped a Nation. New Jersey: John Wiley & Sons, Inc., 2005. 
 Sofka, James R. "The Jeffersonian idea of national security: commerce, the Atlantic balance of power, and the Barbary war, 1786–1805." Diplomatic History 21.4 (1997): 519–544. online
 Turner, Robert F. "President Thomas Jefferson and the Barbary Pirates." in Bruce A Elleman, et al. eds. Piracy and Maritime Crime: Historical and Modern Case Studies (2010): 157–172.  online
Adrian Tinniswood, Pirates of Barbary: Corsairs, Conquests and Captivity in the Seventeenth-Century Mediterranean, 343 pp. Riverhead Books, 2010. . NY Times review
 White, Joshua M.Piracy and Law in the Ottoman Mediterranean (Stanford University Press, 2017). .
White Gold: The Extraordinary Story of Thomas Pellow and North Africa's One Million European Slaves by Giles Milton (Sceptre, 2005)
 Zacks, Richard. The pirate coast : Thomas Jefferson, the first marines and the secret mission of 1805 Hyperion, 2005. 
 Christian slaves, Muslim masters : white slavery in the Mediterranean, the Barbary Coast, and Italy, 1500–1800 by Robert C. Davis. New York : Palgrave Macmillan, 2003. 
Piracy, Slavery and Redemption: Barbary Captivity Narratives from Early Modern England by D. J. Vikus (Columbia University Press, 2001)
The Stolen Village: Baltimore and the Barbary Pirates by Des Ekin 
 Skeletons on the Zahara: A True Story of Survival by Dean King, 
 Oren, Michael. "Early American Encounters in the Middle East", in Power, Faith, and Fantasy. New York: Norton, 2007.

 Lambert, Frank. The Barbary Wars. New York: Hill and Wang, 2005.
 Whipple, A. B. C. To the Shores of Tripoli: The Birth of the U.S. Navy and Marines. Bluejacket Books, 1991.

External links
 
 Knights Hospitaller of St. John – Order of St John of Jerusalem Malta
 The Barbary Pirates
 New book reopens old arguments about slave raids on Europe
 Barbary Warfare
 The Barbary Wars at the Clements Library:An online exhibit on the Barbary Wars with images and transcriptions of primary documents from the period.
 American Barbary Wars

 
19th-century conflicts
 
History of international relations
Early Modern Morocco
History of the foreign relations of the United States
United States Marine Corps in the 18th and 19th centuries
Wars involving the United States